Sepia may refer to:

Biology
 Sepia (genus), a genus of cuttlefish

Color
 Sepia (color), a reddish-brown color
 Sepia tone, a photography technique

Music
 Sepia, a 2001 album by Coco Mbassi
 Sepia (album) by Yu Takahashi
 "Sepia" (song), by the Manic Street Preachers
 a song by Sheila On 7
 "Sepia", a song on the album Perfecto Presents Ibiza by Paul Oakenfold
 "Sepia" (Plan B song), a song on  the album Heaven Before All Hell Breaks Loose

Other uses
 Sepia (restaurant), an upscale restaurant in Chicago
 Sepia (magazine), an African American-focused photojournalism magazine
 nickname of RENFE Class 120 / 121, electric trains used in Spain
 Sepia, a character in the sci-fi anime Fight! Iczer One
 A homeopathic remedy

See also
 Sepia Jack